Freeport is a city, district and free trade zone on the island of Grand Bahama of the northwest Bahamas. In 1955, Wallace Groves, a Virginian financier with lumber interests in Grand Bahama, was granted  of pineyard with substantial areas of swamp and scrubland by the Bahamian government with a mandate to economically develop the area. Freeport has grown to become the second most populous city in the Bahamas.

The main airport serving the city is the Grand Bahama International Airport, which receives domestic flights from various islands of the Bahamas as well as several international flights from the United States and Canada. Freeport is also served by domestic Bahamian ferry services to other islands.

The Grand Bahama Port Authority (GBPA) operates the free trade zone, under the Hawksbill Creek Agreement signed in August 1955 whereby the Bahamian government agreed that businesses in the Freeport area would pay no taxes before 1980, later extended to 2054.

History
Freeport is a  free trade zone on Grand Bahama Island, established in 1955 by the government of The Bahamas. The city of Freeport emerged from a land grant comprising  of swamp and scrub to become a cosmopolitan centre.
The Grand Bahama Port Authority (GBPA) operates the free-trade zone, under special powers conferred by the government under the Hawksbill Creek Agreement, which was recently extended until August 3, 2054.

The city was severely impacted by Hurricane Dorian with damage still being assessed as of 12 September 2019.

Geography
This has positioned it as an ideal centre for international business. Consequently, a growing number of international companies use Freeport for a business site.

National parks
Parks include the Rand Nature Centre, named after its founder James Rand; Petersons Cay, a small isle about 300 yards off the shore of Grand Bahama; and the Lucayan National Park founded by Peter Barratt, a former architect and town planner of Freeport. There is an extensive underwater cave system beneath the park. One cave entrance is accessible by stairs at the national park, while other caves are accessible for certified scubas.

Climate
Freeport features a tropical rainforest climate, similar to South Florida's. According to Köppen Climate Classification (Af), more specifically with hot humid conditions that vary only a little throughout the year. Seldom do temperatures drop below . The winters are usually mild and dry (with the exception of some rainfall due to cold fronts), while the summers are usually hot and wet. Although a freeze has never been reported in the Bahamas, snow was reported to have mixed with rain in Freeport in January 1977, the same time that it snowed in the Miami area.

Economy
Tourism draws more than 1 million visitors per year, but has diminished since 2004, when major hurricanes Hurricane Frances and Hurricane Jeanne made landfall; in 2016, Hurricane Matthew hit the island. In early September 2019, Hurricane Dorian moved over the area and stalled for over a day, causing extensive devastation. Several cruise ships stop weekly at the island. Much of the tourist industry is centered on the seaside suburb of Lucaya, owing its name to the pre-Columbian Lucayan inhabitants of the island evidence of whom has been found on the island. Freeport features at least two Junkanoo festivals near New Year's.

The city is often promoted as Freeport/Lucaya. Most hotels on the island are located in Lucaya along the southern shore facing the Northwest Providence Channel. The primary shopping venue for tourists is the Port Lucaya Marketplace in Lucaya. Recovery from the 2004 Hurricanes Jeanne and Frances took nearly a decade and led to closure of the older shopping venue International Bazaar and neighboring Bahamas Princess Resort and Casino.

Notable natives and residents
 Janine Antoni - conceptual artist
 Robert Antoni - novelist, professor
 Sebastian Bach - Canadian singer, frontman of the band Skid Row
 JoBeth Coleby-Davis - Bahamian Progressive Liberal Party politician, attorney
 Andre Deveaux - NHL player
 Joanna Evans Olympian Swimmer
 Kevin Foxx -  comedian/writer
 Tynia Gaither - sprint Olympian
 Jeffery Gibson - 400mH world champ medalist & Olympian
 Shavez Hart - sprint Olympian
 Jack Hayward - British businessman
 Raymond Higgs - Olympian Jumper
 Buddy Hield - NBA player
 Jonquel Jones - WNBA player
 Johnny Kemp- Singer/Songwriter
 Justin Hill - British writer
 Michael Mathieu - sprint Olympic medalist
 Demetrius Pinder - sprint Olympic medalist
 Mate Pavic - Croatian professional tennis player 
 Vasek Pospisil - Canadian professional tennis player 
 Magnum Rolle - NBA Player
 Alonzo Russell - sprint Olympian medalist
 Nivea Smith - Sprint athlete
 Teray Smith - Sprint Olympian
 Michael Strachan - NFL player
 Donald Thomas - high jump world champion and Olympian
 Andrae Williams - sprint Olympic medalist
 LaToy Williams - sprint athlete
 Chavez Young - baseball player

Twin towns – sister cities
Freeport is twin towns and sister cities with:

 Concord, North Carolina, United States, since 2019 
 Newark, New Jersey, United States, since 1990

Gallery

See also
Mary Star of the Sea Church, Freeport

References

Further reading
Barratt, Peter. Grand Bahama. IM Publishing, Freeport, 2002 (3rd edition)

External links

 "Freeport ( 2009-11-01)," Microsoft Encarta Online Encyclopedia 2008.
 "Fast Facts," Grand Bahama Port Authority, http://www.gbpa.com/index.php/freeport, c.2008.

 
Districts of the Bahamas
Populated places in the Bahamas
Grand Bahama
Populated places established in 1955
1955 establishments in the British Empire